KICK may refer to:

 KICK (AM), a radio station (1340 AM) licensed to serve Springfield, Missouri, United States
 KICK-FM, a radio station (97.9 FM) licensed to Palmyra, Missouri
 CKIC-FM, a radio station (92.9 FM) licensed to Winnipeg, Manitoba, Canada, branded as KICK-FM
 Karate International Council of Kickboxing
 KICK (Detroit), a Michigan non-profit business

See also
 Kick (disambiguation)